Cladrastis (yellowwood) is a genus of nine species of flowering plants in the family Fabaceae, eight native to eastern Asia, and one to southeastern North America.

Species of Cladrastis are small to medium-sized deciduous trees typically growing 10–20 m tall, exceptionally to 27 m tall. The leaves are compound pinnate, with 5–17 alternately arranged leaflets. The flowers are fragrant, white or pink, produced in racemes or panicles 15–40 cm long. The fruit is a pod 3–8 cm long, containing one to six seeds.

Cladrastis is related to the genus Maackia, from which it differs in having the buds concealed in the leaf base, and in the leaflets being arranged alternately on the leaf rachis, not in opposite pairs. The genus name derives from the Greek klados, branch, and thraustos, fragile, referring to the brittle nature of the twigs.  The combination of Cladrastis, Pickeringia and Styphnolobium form a monophyletic clade known as the Cladrastis clade; as the other two originated from within Cladrastis, Cladrastis is paraphyletic.

Species
Cladrastis comprises the following species:

 Cladrastis chingii Duley & Vincent
 Cladrastis delavayi (Franch.) Prain

 Cladrastis kentukea (Dum. Cours.) Rudd—Southeastern North America.

 Cladrastis parvifolia C.Y. Ma—Guanxi, China.
 Cladrastis platycarpa (Maxim.) Makino—Japan.
 Cladrastis scandens C.Y. Ma—Guizhou, China.

 Cladrastis shikokiana (Makino) Makino—Southern Japan.

 Cladrastis sinensis Hemsl.—China, widespread.

 Cladrastis wilsonii Takeda—Central China.

References

Further reading

Faboideae
Fabaceae genera
Taxa named by Constantine Samuel Rafinesque